The Black Reel Award for Television for Outstanding Drama Series is an annual award given to the best television drama series of the year. This Is Us became the first winner in this category. The show also holds the record for most wins, with 2. This Is Us and Queen Sugar are currently tied for the most nominations in this category with 3 nominations.

This Is Us also became the first Network show to win this category while Pose became the first cable series to win.

2010s

2020s

Programs with multiple awards

2 awards
 This Is Us

Programs with multiple nominations

4 nominations
 This Is Us

3 nominations
 Queen Sugar

2 nominations
 Black Lightning
 Pose
 Lupin

Total awards by network
 NBC – 2
 CW - 1
 FX - 1
 HBO - 1
 Peacock - 1

References

Black Reel Awards